Bomber Girl (stylized in all caps) is a Japanese manga series written and illustrated by Makoto Niwano. It was published in Shueisha's Weekly Shōnen Jump from January to April 1994.

In North America, the series was published by Gutsoon Entertainment and serialized in its Raijin Comics manga anthology.

Plot

Release
Bomber Girl is written and illustrated by Makoto Niwano. It was published in Shueisha's Weekly Shōnen Jump from January 31 to April 11, 1994. The eleven individual chapters were compiled in a single tankōbon volume on August 4, 1994.

In North America, the series was published by Gutsoon Entertainment and serialized in its Raijin Comics manga anthology.

Reception
The series received very negative critics from manga and anime reviewers. John Jakala said that the first instalment of the series was okay, but the second was even more amateur. He referred to a car panel as it looked like something an elementary school child would draw in the margins of his math notebook. He also noted that he does not want to pay for work of such unprofessional quality. He cast his vote against Bomber Girl on an online survey. John Jakala continuously made fun of the series in the later reviews.

Jason Thompson described it as "amoral girl with big boobs killing and torturing people," despising the manga as he stated, "[it] is so awful that I assume it got published because [Makoto] Niwano jumped into an icy river to save [Tetsuo] Hara and [Tsukasa] Hojo from drowning." Eduardo M. Chavez of Mania Entertainment pondered, "For those looking for a manga with a lot of action, a good amount of fan-service, and some crazy looking characters this might be a good call. ...

References

External links

Action anime and manga
Comedy anime and manga
Seinen manga
Science fiction anime and manga
Shōnen manga
Shōnen Gahōsha manga
Shueisha manga